Wayne Fontes Music is a studio album by American underground rapper and producer Marv Won, released January 1, 2010, a month after his previous work Way Of The Won. The album was named after Detroit Lions head coach Wayne Fontes the way Marv spits lyrics on it.

In 2009, Marv released music video for DJ Houseshoes produced track "Stomp", directed by Mario Butterfield, with cameo appearances by The Fat Killahz, Tre Little, T3 (of Slum Village), Quest MCody, Danny Brown, Mike Luke and Big Proof (by added footage).

In 2010, Marv and Rio Data released another video from the album, for Nathaniel Hall and Che Patterson produced "Totally Awesome" (named after the gem of a Tracy Morgan sample from a movie of the same name that kicks off the track), directed by Scrill Gates and Mario "Khalif" Butterfield, features cameos by Fatt Father, Miz Korona, Guilty Simpson, Kat, DJ Bet, Big Tone, Jimi Moto, Mike Luke, Supa Emcee, Lovjoy, Ron Dance, Darren Brown, Chips, Moe Dirdee, Burn Rubber Rick, Ro Spit, Magnetic among others

Track listing

References

External links 

2010 albums
Fat Killahz albums
Underground hip hop albums
Albums produced by Mr. Porter